Anticlea occidentalis is a species in the Melanthiaceae (bunchflower) family with the common names bronze-bells or western featherbells. It is found in mountains in the Pacific Northwest region of North America.

References

Melanthiaceae
Plants described in 2002
Flora of the Northwestern United States